Tamil Supplement is a Unicode block containing Tamil historic fractions and symbols.

Block

History
The following Unicode-related documents record the purpose and process of defining specific characters in the Tamil Supplement block:

References 

Unicode blocks